The ABC Champions Cup 2002 was the 13th staging of the ABC Champions Cup, the basketball club tournament of Asian Basketball Confederation. The tournament was held in Kuala Lumpur, Malaysia between April 28 to May 5, 2002.

Preliminary round

Group A

Group B

Knockout round

Semifinals

Finals

Final standings

Awards
Most Valuable Player:  Kristaan Johnson (Al-Rayyan)
Best Three Point Shooter:  Son Gyu-Wan (Sangmu)
Most Valuable Coach:  Ahmed Abdul Hadi (Al-Rayyan)

References
Asia-Basket

2002
Champions Cup
ABC
Basketball Asia Champions Cup 2002